This article is about transport in Belarus.

Railways 

Rail transport in Belarus is operated by Belarusskaya Chyhunka
total:

country comparison to the world: 32
broad gauge:
 of  gauge ( electrified) (2006)

City with underground railway system: Minsk, see Minsk Metro
For tramway systems: see List of town tramway systems in Belarus

Highways 

The owners of highways may be the Republic of Belarus, its political subdivisions, legal and natural persons, who own roads, as well as legal entities, which roads are fixed on the basis of economic or operational management.

Republican state administration in the field of roads and road activity is the Department Belavtodor under the Ministry of Transport and Communications of the Republic of Belarus.

total:

paved:
 (2003)

Waterways 
 (use limited by location on perimeter of country and by shallowness) (2003)
country comparison to the world: 37

Pipelines 
gas ; oil ; refined products  (2008)

Ports and harbors 
 Mazyr - on the river Pripyat

Airports 

65 (2008):
country comparison to the world: 76

 Minsk International Airport
 Minsk-1
 Gomel Airport

Airports - with paved runways 

total:
35
over :
2
:
22
:
4
:
1
under :
6 (2008)

Airports - with unpaved runways 
total:
30
:
1
:
1
:
2
under :
26 (2008)

Heliports 
1 (2007)Heliports is where helicopter land.

National air-carrier 
Belavia

See also
Transport in the Soviet Union
Vehicle registration plates of Belarus

References

External links
Automobiles, Trains And Buses - Getting Around Belarus